Miranda Khorava (born 19 November 1977) is a Georgian chess player who holds the FIDE title of Woman International Master (WIM, 1995). She is a winner of Georgian Women's Chess Championship (1995).

Biography
In the late 1990s Miranda Khorava was one of Georgian leading female chess players. She participated in European Youth Chess Championships and World Youth Chess Championships. In 1995, Miranda Khorava won Georgian Women's Chess Championship. In 1995, Miranda Khorava participated in Women's World Chess Championship Interzonal Tournament in Chişinău where ranked 23rd place.

In 1995, she was awarded the FIDE Woman International Master (WIM) title.

References

External links

1977 births
Living people
Female chess players from Georgia (country)
Chess Woman International Masters